Short Heath is a hamlet near Overseal, in South Derbyshire.

History
It has a sign where it claims to be the centre of England, but various places make this claim. Nearby Overseal was said to be the population centre of Britain in 1971 with an equal number of people living south as north of it and similarly for east and west. However, this centre has slowly been moving southwards and is now claimed by Appleby Parva in north-west Leicestershire.

References

Hamlets in Derbyshire
South Derbyshire District